William Walton Sharman (May 25, 1926 – October 25, 2013) was an American professional basketball player and coach.  He is mostly known for his time with the Boston Celtics in the 1950s, partnering with Bob Cousy in what was then considered the greatest backcourt duo of all time.  As a coach, Sharman won titles in the ABL, ABA, and NBA, and is credited with introducing the now-ubiquitous morning shootaround.

He was the first North American sports figure to win a championship as a player, coach, and executive. He was a 10-time NBA champion (having won four titles as a player with the Celtics, one as head coach of the Los Angeles Lakers, and five as a Lakers executive), and a 12-time World Champion in basketball overall counting his ABL and ABA titles. Sharman is also a two-time Naismith Memorial Basketball Hall of Fame inductee, having been inducted in 1976 as a player, and in 2004 as a coach. Only John Wooden, Lenny Wilkens, Tommy Heinsohn and Bill Russell share this double honor.

Early years
Sharman completed high school in the Central California city of Porterville, California.  He served during World War II from 1944 to 1946 in the US Navy, and was a graduate of the University of Southern California. He played 1st base on the 1948 USC Trojans' College World Series championship team.   Following his senior year, Sharman was selected as one of the 1950 NCAA Men's Basketball All-Americans.

Baseball career
From 1950 to 1955 Sharman played professional baseball in the Brooklyn Dodgers minor league system.  He was called up to the Dodgers late in the 1951 season but did not appear in a game. He was part of a September 27 game in which the entire Brooklyn bench was cleared from the dugout for arguing with the home plate umpire over a ruling at the plate. This has led to the legend that Sharman holds the distinction of being the only player in baseball history to have ever been ejected from a major league game without ever appearing in one. However, although Sharman was among the Dodger bench players that had to go to the clubhouse, none of them were actually barred from playing in the game. In fact, in the top of the ninth, one of the other dismissed players, Wayne Terwilliger, was used as a pinch-hitter in the game.

NBA playing career

Sharman was drafted by the Washington Capitols in the 2nd round of the 1950 NBA draft.  Following the disbanding of the Capitols, he was selected by the Fort Wayne Pistons in the dispersal draft and was subsequently traded to the Boston Celtics (with Bob Brannum) for Chuck Share prior to the 1951–52 season.  Sharman played a total of ten seasons for the Celtics, leading the team in scoring between the 1955–56 and 1958–59 seasons and averaging over 20 points per game during three of them.

Sharman was one of the first NBA guards to shoot better than .400 from the field. He led the NBA in free throw percentage a record seven times (including a record five consecutive seasons), and his mark of 93.2% in the 1958–59 season remained the NBA record until Ernie DiGregorio topped it in 1976–77.  Sharman still holds the record for consecutive free throws in the playoffs with 56.  Sharman was named to the All-NBA First Team from 1956 through 1959, and was an All-NBA Second Team member in 1953, 1955, and 1960.

Sharman played in eight NBA All-Star games, scoring in double figures in seven of them.  He was named the 1955 NBA All-Star Game MVP after scoring ten of his fifteen points in the fourth quarter.  Sharman still holds the NBA All-Star Game record for field goals attempted in a quarter with 12.

Sharman ended his NBA playing career after 11 seasons in 1961.

Professional coaching career
Sharman coached the Cleveland Pipers of the American Basketball League to the league championship in 1962.  He next went on to coach Los Angeles State (now California State, Los Angeles) for two seasons.

In 1966, Sharman became the coach of the NBA's San Francisco Warriors. In their first season under Sharman, the Warriors won the Western Division and made it to the Finals, where they lost to the Philadelphia 76ers. In his second and final season with the Warriors, the team finished third and lost in the Division Finals to the Lakers.

In 1970–71 he coached the Utah Stars to an ABA title and was a co-recipient of the ABA Coach of the Year honors. After resigning as coach for the Utah Stars, Sharman signed a contract to coach the Los Angeles Lakers.  Controversy later ensued when the owner of the Utah Stars brought suit against Sharman for breach of contract stemming from his resignation, and a tort case against the owner of the Los Angeles Lakers for inducing such breach of contract.  Sharman was originally ordered to pay $250,000 in damages, but later appealed the trial court decision and reversed the judgement.

The following season, he guided the Wilt Chamberlain and Jerry West-led Los Angeles Lakers to an NBA record 33 game win streak, a then-record 69–13 win–loss mark, the first Lakers championship in Los Angeles and the first for the team in more than a decade.  That season, Sharman was named NBA Coach of the Year. He is one of two men to win NBA and ABA championships as a coach; coincidentally, the other, Alex Hannum, also coached a Chamberlain-led team (the 1967 Philadelphia 76ers) to an NBA championship.

Sharman invented the morning shootaround as a way to burn off nervous energy on game days. He took the shootaround with him to his first coaching jobs in the ABL, the ABA, and later, the NBA.  After the Lakers won the championship in 1972, every other team in the league added the shootaround to its game-day regimen.

Later years

Sharman was enshrined in the Basketball Hall of Fame in 1976 as a player and again in 2004 as a coach. He is one of only five people to be enshrined in both categories, the others being Bill Russell, John Wooden, Lenny Wilkens, and his former teammate Tom Heinsohn.

In 1971, Sharman was named to the NBA 25th Anniversary Team. On October 29, 1996, Sharman was named one of the NBA's 50 Greatest Players. In October 2021, Sharman was again honored as one of the league’s greatest players of all time by being named to the NBA 75th Anniversary Team.

As Lakers general manager, Sharman built the 1980 and 1982 NBA championship teams, and as Lakers president he oversaw the 1985, 1987, and 1988 NBA championship teams. Sharman retired from the Lakers front office in 1991 at age 65.

Sharman was the author of two books, Sharman on Basketball Shooting and The Wooden-Sharman Method: A Guide to Winning Basketball with John Wooden and Bob Selzer.

The gymnasium at Porterville High School is named after him. After his former basketball team the Los Angeles Jets dissolved in 1962, he sued to enforce his employment contract with the Jets, culminating in the case Sharman v. Longo (1967) 249 Cal.App.2d 948.

In 2013, Sharman sold his 2010 NBA championship ring from the Lakers to benefit charity.

Death
Sharman died at his home in Redondo Beach, California, on October 25, 2013, at the age of 87, after having had a stroke the week prior.

NBA career statistics

Regular season

Playoffs

Head coaching record

|-
| style="text-align:left;"|San Francisco
| style="text-align:left;"|
|81||44||37|||| style="text-align:center;"|1st in Western||15||9||6||
| style="text-align:center;"|Lost in NBA Finals
|-
| style="text-align:left;"|San Francisco
| style="text-align:left;"|
|82||43||39|||| style="text-align:center;"|3rd in Western||10||4||6||
| style="text-align:center;"|Lost in Div. Finals
|-
| style="text-align:left;"|Los Angeles (ABA)
| style="text-align:left;"|
|78||33||45|||| style="text-align:center;"|5th in Western||-||-||-||
| style="text-align:center;"|Missed Playoffs
|-
| style="text-align:left;"|Los Angeles (ABA)
| style="text-align:left;"|
|84||43||41|||| style="text-align:center;"|4th in Western||17||10||7||
| style="text-align:center;"|Lost in ABA Finals
|- ! style="background:#FDE910;"
| style="text-align:left;"|Utah (ABA)
| style="text-align:left;"|
|84||57||27|||| style="text-align:center;"|2nd in Western||18||12||6||
| style="text-align:center;"|Won ABA Championship
|- ! style="background:#FDE910;"
| style="text-align:left;"|Los Angeles
| style="text-align:left;"|
|82||69||13|||| style="text-align:center;"|1st in Pacific||15||12||3||
| style="text-align:center;"|Won NBA Championship
|-
| style="text-align:left;"|Los Angeles
| style="text-align:left;"|
|82||60||22|||| style="text-align:center;"|1st in Pacific||17||9||8||
| style="text-align:center;"|Lost in NBA Finals
|-
| style="text-align:left;"|Los Angeles
| style="text-align:left;"|
|82||47||35|||| style="text-align:center;"|1st in Pacific||5||1||4||
| style="text-align:center;"|Lost in Conf. Semifinals
|-
| style="text-align:left;"|Los Angeles
| style="text-align:left;"|
|82||30||52|||| style="text-align:center;"|5th in Pacific||-||-||-||
| style="text-align:center;"|Missed Playoffs
|-
| style="text-align:left;"|Los Angeles
| style="text-align:left;"|
|82||40||42|||| style="text-align:center;"|4th in Pacific||-||-||-||
| style="text-align:center;"|Missed Playoffs
|- class="sortbottom"
| style="text-align:left;"|Career
| ||819||466||353|||| ||97||57||40||||

References

External links

 
 
 Profile as a player
 Profile as a coach

1926 births
2013 deaths
All-American college men's basketball players
American Basketball League (1961–62) coaches
American Basketball League (1961–62) players
American men's basketball coaches
American men's basketball players
Basketball coaches from Texas
Basketball players from Texas
Boston Celtics players
Cal State Los Angeles Golden Eagles men's basketball coaches
Los Angeles Lakers head coaches
Los Angeles Lakers executives
Naismith Memorial Basketball Hall of Fame inductees
National Basketball Association All-Stars
National Basketball Association championship-winning head coaches
National Basketball Association players with retired numbers
People from Porterville, California
San Francisco Warriors head coaches
Shooting guards
Sportspeople from Abilene, Texas
Sportspeople from Tulare County, California
USC Trojans men's basketball players
Utah Stars coaches
Washington Capitols draft picks
Washington Capitols players
United States Navy personnel of World War II